The 36th Film Independent Spirit Awards, honoring the best independent films and television series of 2020, were presented by Film Independent on April 22, 2021. Though it was initially intended for the ceremony to air on April 24, 2021, it was later changed to April 22, 2021. The nominations were announced on January 26, 2021 by Laverne Cox, Barry Jenkins, and Olivia Wilde. The ceremony was televised in the United States on IFC and streamed exclusively by AMC+. Melissa Villaseñor hosted the ceremony.

Expansion
This year, the Film Independent expanded categories in order to honor television series for the first time, debuting five new categories: Best New Scripted Series, Best New Non-Scripted or Documentary Series, Best Male Performance in a New Scripted Series, Best Female Performance in a New Scripted Series, and Best Ensemble Cast in a New Scripted Series.

Winners and nominees

Film

{| class=wikitable style="width=100%"
|-
! style="width=50%" | Best Feature
! style="width=50%" | Best Director
|-
| valign="top" |
Nomadland
 First Cow
 Ma Rainey's Black Bottom
 Minari
 Never Rarely Sometimes Always
| valign="top" |
Chloé Zhao – Nomadland
 Lee Isaac Chung – Minari
 Emerald Fennell – Promising Young Woman
 Eliza Hittman – Never Rarely Sometimes Always
 Kelly Reichardt – First Cow
|-
! style="width=50%" | Best Male Lead
! style="width=50%" | Best Female Lead
|-
| valign="top" |
Riz Ahmed – Sound of Metal as Ruben Stone
 Chadwick Boseman – Ma Rainey's Black Bottom as Levee Green (posthumous)
 Adarsh Gourav – The White Tiger as Balram Halwai
 Rob Morgan – Bull as Abe
 Steven Yeun – Minari as Jacob Yi
| valign="top" |
Carey Mulligan – Promising Young Woman as Cassandra "Cassie" Thomas
 Nicole Beharie – Miss Juneteenth as Turquoise Jones
 Viola Davis – Ma Rainey's Black Bottom as Ma Rainey
 Sidney Flanigan – Never Rarely Sometimes Always as Autumn Callahan
 Julia Garner – The Assistant as Jane
 Frances McDormand – Nomadland as Fern
|-
! style="width=50%" | Best Supporting Male
! style="width=50%" | Best Supporting Female
|-
| valign="top" |
Paul Raci – Sound of Metal as Joe
 Colman Domingo – Ma Rainey's Black Bottom as Cutler
 Orion Lee – First Cow as King-Lu
 Glynn Turman – Ma Rainey's Black Bottom as Toledo
 Benedict Wong – Nine Days as Kyo
| valign="top" |
Youn Yuh-jung – Minari as Soon-ja
 Alexis Chikaeze – Miss Juneteenth as Kai Jones
 Yeri Han – Minari as Monica Yi
 Valerie Mahaffey – French Exit as Madame Reynaud
 Talia Ryder – Never Rarely Sometimes Always as Skylar
|-
! style="width=50%" | Best Screenplay
! style="width=50%" | Best First Screenplay
|-
| valign="top" |
Emerald Fennell – Promising Young Woman
 Lee Isaac Chung – Minari
 Eliza Hittman – Never Rarely Sometimes Always
 Mike Makowsky – Bad Education
 Alice Wu – The Half of It
| valign="top" |
Andy Siara – Palm Springs
 Kitty Green – The Assistant
 Noah Hutton – Lapsis
 Channing Godfrey Peoples – Miss Juneteenth
 James Sweeney – Straight Up
|-
! style="width=50%" | Best First Feature
! style="width=50%" | Best Documentary Feature
|-
| valign="top" |
Darius Marder – Sound of Metal
 Radha Blank – The Forty-Year-Old Version
 Heidi Ewing – I Carry You with Me
 Edson Oda – Nine Days
 Channing Godfrey Peoples – Miss Juneteenth
| valign="top" |
Crip Camp
 Collective
 Dick Johnson Is Dead
 The Mole Agent
 Time
|-
! style="width=50%" | Best Cinematography
! style="width=50%" | Best Editing
|-
| valign="top" |
Joshua James Richards – Nomadland
 Jay Keitel – She Dies Tomorrow
 Shabier Kirchner – Bull
 Michael Latham – The Assistant
 Hélène Louvart – Never Rarely Sometimes Always
| valign="top" |
Chloé Zhao – Nomadland
 Andy Canny – The Invisible Man
 Scott Cummings – Never Rarely Sometimes Always
 Merawi Gerima – Residue
 Enat Sidi – I Carry You with Me
|-
! colspan="2" style="width=50%" | Best International Film
|-
| colspan="2" valign="top" |
Quo Vadis, Aida? Bacurau
 The Disciple
 Night of the Kings
 Preparations to Be Together for an Unknown Period of Time
|}

Films with multiple nominations and awards

Television
{| class=wikitable style="width=100%"
|-
! style="width=50%" | Best New Scripted Series
! style="width=50%" | Best New Non-Scripted or Documentary Series
|-
| valign="top" |I May Destroy You (BBC One / HBO) Little America (Apple TV+)
 Small Axe (Prime Video)
 A Teacher (FX on Hulu)
 Unorthodox (Netflix)
| valign="top" |Immigration Nation (Netflix) Atlanta's Missing and Murdered: The Lost Children (HBO)
 City So Real (National Geographic)
 Love Fraud (Showtime)
 We're Here (HBO)
|-
! style="width=50%" | Best Male Performance in a New Scripted Series
! style="width=50%" | Best Female Performance in a New Scripted Series
|-
| valign="top" |Amit Rahav – Unorthodox as Yakov "Yanky" Shapiro (Netflix) Adam Ali – Little America as Zain (Apple TV+)
 Nicco Annan – P-Valley as Uncle Clifford (Starz)
 Conphidance – Little America as Iwegbuna (Apple TV+)
 Harold Torres – ZeroZeroZero as Manuel Contreras (Prime Video)
| valign="top" |Shira Haas – Unorthodox as Esther "Esty" Shapiro (Netflix) Elle Fanning – The Great as Catherine the Great (Hulu)
 Abby McEnany – Work in Progress as Abby (Showtime)
 Maitreyi Ramakrishnan – Never Have I Ever as Devi Vishwakumar (Netflix)
 Jordan Kristine Seamón – We Are Who We Are as Caitlin Poythress / Harper (HBO)
|-
! colspan="2" style="width=50%" | Best Ensemble Cast in a New Scripted Series
|-
| colspan="2" valign="top" |I May Destroy You – Michaela Coel, Paapa Essiedu, Weruche Opia, and Stephen Wight|}

Series with multiple nominations and awards

Special awards

John Cassavetes Award
(The award is given to the best feature made for under $500,000; recipients are the writer, director, and producer)Residue
 The Killing of Two Lovers
 La Leyenda Negra
 Lingua Franca
 Saint Frances

Robert Altman Award
(The award is given to its film director, casting director, and ensemble cast)

 One Night in Miami... – Regina King, Kimberly R. Hardin, Kingsley Ben-Adir, Eli Goree, Aldis Hodge, and Leslie Odom Jr.

Emerging Filmmakers Awards

Producers Award
The award honors emerging producers, who despite highly limited resources demonstrate the creativity, tenacity, and vision required to create quality independent films. The winner receives a $25,000 unrestricted cash grant courtesy of Spirit Award Premier Sponsors Genesis Motor North America.

 Gerry Kim
 Kara Durrett
 Lucas Joaquin

Someone to Watch Award
The award honors a talented filmmaker of singular vision who has not yet received appropriate recognition. The winner receives a $25,000 unrestricted cash grant courtesy of Spirit Award Premier Sponsors Genesis Motor North America.

 Ekwa Msangi – Farewell Amor
 David Midell – The Killing of Kenneth Chamberlain
 Annie Silverstein – Bull

Truer than Fiction Award
The award honors to an emerging director of non-fiction features who has not yet received appropriate recognition. The winner receives a $25,000 unrestricted cash grant courtesy of Spirit Award Premier Sponsors Genesis Motor North America.

 Elegance Bratton – Pier Kids
 Cecilia Aldarondo – Landfall
 Elizabeth Lo – Stray

See also
 93rd Academy Awards
 78th Golden Globe Awards
 74th British Academy Film Awards
 41st Golden Raspberry Awards
 27th Screen Actors Guild Awards
 26th Critics' Choice Awards

References

External links
 

Independent Spirit Awards
2020 film awards
2020 television awards
2021 awards in the United States